Cereopsius whitei is a species of beetle in the family Cerambycidae. It was described by James Thomson in 1865. It is known from Malaysia and Indonesia.

References

Cereopsius
Beetles described in 1865